Ženski nogometni klub Olimpija Ljubljana, commonly referred to as ŽNK Olimpija Ljubljana or simply Olimpija, is a women's football team from Ljubljana, Slovenia, established in 2015.

They were crowned champions of the 2016–17 Slovenian Women's League, and made their European debut in the 2017–18 UEFA Women's Champions League.

Honours
Slovenian League
 Winners: 2016–17, 2017–18
 Runners-up: 2018–19, 2020–21, 2021–22

Slovenian Cup
 Winners: 2020–21, 2021–22

References

External links

Women's football clubs in Slovenia
Association football clubs established in 2015
2015 establishments in Slovenia
Sports clubs in Ljubljana